there are about 130 places of worship in use on the Isle of Wight, England's largest island.  A wide range of Christian denominations are represented, and Muslims have a mosque in the island's main town of Newport.  The diamond-shaped,  island lies in the English Channel, separated from the county of Hampshire by the Solent.  Its population of around 140,000 is spread across several small towns and dozens of villages.  Many of the island's churches and chapels are in the ancient ports of Yarmouth and Newport, the Victorian seaside resorts of Ryde, Sandown, Shanklin and Ventnor, and the twin towns of Cowes and East Cowes; but even the smallest villages often have their own Anglican parish churches and sometimes a Nonconformist chapel.  Methodism has been particularly strong on the island for over 200 years, and two of England's oldest Roman Catholic churches are also located here. 

Sixty-two churches and chapels have been awarded listed status by Historic England or its predecessor organisations in recognition of their architectural and historical interest.  These range from the large and ancient parish churches in villages such as Arreton, Brading and Carisbrooke to the thatch-roofed St Agnes' Church at Freshwater Bay and the concrete-framed St Faith's Church at Cowes—both of the early 20th century—and from the simple and plain Methodist chapel at Godshill to the elaborate Castlehold Baptist Chapel in Newport.  A building is defined as "listed" when it is placed on a statutory register of buildings of "special architectural or historic interest" in accordance with the Planning (Listed Buildings and Conservation Areas) Act 1990.  The Department for Digital, Culture, Media and Sport, a Government department, is responsible for listing; Historic England, a non-departmental public body, acts as an agency of the department to administer the process and advise the department on relevant issues.  There are three grades of listing status. Grade I, the highest, is defined as being of "exceptional interest"; Grade II* is used for "particularly important buildings of more than special interest"; and Grade II, the lowest, is used for buildings of "special interest".  As of February 2001, there were 26 Grade I-listed buildings, 55 with Grade II* status and 1,823 Grade II-listed buildings on the Isle of Wight.

Various administrative areas operated by the Church of England, the Roman Catholic Church, the United Reformed Church, Baptists and Methodists cover churches on the island which are part of their denominations.  These areas include dioceses, archdeaconries, networks and circuits.

Overview of the island and its places of worship

The Isle of Wight is situated in the English Channel off the south coast of England. The resident population was estimated to be 139,105 in mid-2014, a slight increase on the 138,400 at the time of the United Kingdom Census 2011. Only seven towns have a population of 6,000 or more. Ryde, whose population in 2011 was approximately 18,700, developed from two villages in the late 18th century: Lower Ryde, on the seashore, was for centuries a landing point for boats from the mainland, and this was formalised when a pier was built in 1814. Upper Ryde, its inland neighbour, was connected to it in 1780, and rapid development ensued through the Regency and early Victorian eras. Newport, the county town, is slightly smaller (population 17,200) but much older: founded  1180 as a "new port" for the island, centrally located on the River Medina, it retains its medieval grid pattern of streets (although the oldest surviving buildings are 17th-century). Cowes and East Cowes, facing each other across the Medina estuary and connected by a chain ferry, have 14,400 and 7,800 residents respectively; they developed as industrial and port towns in the 17th and 18th centuries, and became fashionable residential areas in the 19th century. Stimulated by the arrival of the railway in 1864, Sandown (population 7,200) developed as a seaside resort in the last quarter of the 19th century, and the ancient village of Shanklin grew rapidly at the same time, reaching an estimated population of 7,100 by 2011. Ventnor (population 6,000) was already more developed by the time the railway arrived in 1866: early 19th-century visitors discovered the village's dramatic setting, and formal urban planning began in the 1830s.

The island was converted to Christianity in the late 7th century, although sources differ as to who was responsible: the Anglo-Saxon Chronicle identifies Wulfhere of Mercia, but Bede (writing in the 8th century) gives a date of 686 and  names Cædwalla of Wessex.  A series of parishes were later established, some very large and spanning the whole island from north to south.  By the time of the Domesday survey in 1086 there were ten churches on the island, and some chapels originally associated with the island's many manors became parish churches in their own right later in the Middle Ages.  Of the churches established in the Saxon era, only fragments remain: Arreton and Freshwater both retain structural features from that period.  Likewise, Norman churches survive only in parts, as at Shalfleet (the massive square tower), Yaverland (a "remarkable 12th-century doorway") and Wootton (where St Edmund's Church also has an intricately moulded Norman doorway).  More significant is the island's array of Gothic church architecture—particularly that of the Early English period.  Notable Early English work can be seen in the parish churches of Brading, Calbourne and Newchurch.  Decorated Gothic features survive at Arreton and Freshwater, and there are Perpendicular Gothic towers at Carisbrooke, Chale and Gatcombe, arcades at Brading, Brighstone and Mottistone, and porches at Arreton, Niton and Whitwell.

The 17th century was a period of church restoration and some new construction. Yarmouth (1626) retains much of its original appearance; St Mary's Church at Cowes dates from 1657 but has been rebuilt; and rebuilding of older churches took place at Newchurch, Shalfleet, Shorwell and Godshill.   Monuments to prominent island families such as the Oglander and Worsley baronets and the Leighs of Godshill are another important feature of this era.  At several churches, though, church architecture and fittings of this era and of the 18th century was swept away amid Victorian restoration, and the island's stock of Anglican churches grew substantially in the 19th century in line with urban growth and the splitting up of ancient parishes.  New churches replaced smaller medieval buildings at St Lawrence (1878, by George Gilbert Scott) and Bonchurch (by Benjamin Ferrey, 1847–48) and the ruined chapel in the hamlet of Newtown (1835, by local architect A. F. Livesay).  In St Helens, the ruined Norman-era church dedicated to St Helena was replaced further inland in 1717, but the new church was rebuilt in 1829 and substantially altered and extended in 1862.  Many Anglican churches on the island were either built or reconstructed in the 1850s or 1860s, mostly in a range of Gothic Revival styles—some with distinctive features such as the tower at Whippingham, the tall spire at Holy Trinity, Ventnor and the interior of St Mary's, Cowes, where a new church with a complex polychrome brickwork interior was grafted on to the "remarkable" tower designed by John Nash.  Thomas Hellyer of Ryde, described by Nikolaus Pevsner as a "very individualistic" and "remarkable" architect, was responsible for several churches in this era—both new buildings (at Bembridge, Havenstreet, Oakfield, Seaview, St Saviour's at Shanklin and the now closed Holy Trinity at Ryde) and rebuilding work (at Binstead and East Cowes).

Roman Catholic churches are found in the island's towns and larger villages.  Those at Cowes and Newport, both dedicated to Saint Thomas of Canterbury, are the island's only 18th-century churches of any denomination and are nationally important because of their early dates: the Roman Catholic Relief Act was passed in 1791, and Newport's church was built in that year, followed five years later by the Cowes church.  Architecturally dissimilar, both churches were funded by Elizabeth Heneage.  St Mary's Church at Ryde came next, designed by Joseph Hansom in the 1840s, and by the early 20th century Ventnor, East Cowes, Sandown and Shanklin had their own churches.  St Patrick's at Sandown survives in its original condition, whereas St David's at East Cowes and the Sacred Heart at Shanklin suffered bomb damage in World War II were rebuilt after the war, and the Church of Our Lady and St Wilfrid in Ventnor burnt down in 2006 and was rebuilt in 2015.  In 1965 a purpose-built Catholic church opened in Bembridge, which had a long history of Catholic worship in private chapels and a former Wesleyan church.  Similarly St Saviour's Church at Totland (1923) succeeds a private chapel which had opened in 1871 in the nearby manor house.  The chapel at St Dominic's Priory at Carisbrooke and a now vanished tin tabernacle at Appuldurcombe House were also used for public worship in the early 20th century and before, and chapels at Quarr Abbey at Binstead and St Cecilia's Abbey at Ryde are still registered for public worship.  Nikolaus Pevsner, who was mostly dismissive of the island's 20th-century architecture, considered St Saviour's to be "the most striking" church of any denomination apart from Quarr Abbey and its chapel, which he identified as "the dominant architectural achievement" of the century.

Among Nonconformist groups, Methodism is particularly prominent.  Its history on the island can be traced back to 1735, when John and Charles Wesley visited and Charles preached at Cowes; John's subsequent visits included a trip in 1781 to open a chapel in Newport.  Six years later the first permanent preacher was appointed: originally a Wesleyan, Mary Toms joined the Bible Christian Methodists in 1817, and the Isle of Wight "[became] a stronghold of the Bible Christian movement".  By 1851, when a religious census was carried out in the United Kingdom, the movement had 26 places of worship.  Many old chapels built by the Bible Christians survive, for example at Brading (where Toms herself founded a "preaching house" in 1837), Rookley (1859), Arreton (1866) and Newport (1879–80).  The Wesleyan branch of Methodism was also well-supported—there were 24 places of worship for Wesleyans in 1851—and many of their chapels remain in use, such as the "monumental" church in Ryde, the 1838 chapel at Godshill and the 1864 chapel at Niton.  A few Primitive Methodist chapels were also built, although none remain in Methodist use.  Examples include Newport (now used by the Salvation Army), Ryde and Sandown (1866).  New Methodist chapels were built throughout the 20th century, for example in Lake (a "stylish, typically late 1950s" building) and Brighstone (1999), and in 2014 a new church opened at Freshwater to serve that village and nearby Totland.  In contrast, Baptist chapels are confined to the main towns and a few villages.  Several congregations have a long unbroken history of worship: the three surviving rural chapels date from 1805 (Wellow), 1836 (Freshwater) and 1849 (Niton), and Castlehold Baptist Church at Newport was built in 1812.  The Castlehold congregation seceded from the town's original Baptist chapel, which later developed a Unitarian character which it still holds.  Congregationalism gained little ground on the island, but independent Congregational churches survive at Langbridge near Newchurch (founded in 1845) and Newport—where a 21st-century building houses a congregation with 17th-century origins.  Congregational chapels which joined the United Reformed Church when that denomination was formed in 1972 can be found in Freshwater, Ryde and Shanklin.

In the 20th century a greater variety of Christian denominations began to be represented, mainly in the island's towns.  Pentecostal churches of various types can be found in Newport, Ryde and Sandown; Spiritualists worship in Cowes (where a congregation has met since the 1930s), Ryde and Ventnor; Quakers, the Salvation Army and The Church of Jesus Christ of Latter-day Saints have premises in Newport; and there are four Kingdom Halls of Jehovah's Witnesses.  There are also various gospel halls and Evangelical and non-denominational churches, some of which occupy former chapels built by other communities.  For example, Zion Chapel in Swanmore and the Avenue Road Evangelical Church in Sandown were originally mid-19th-century Wesleyan chapels; the Ryde premises of the Grace Church IoW was built as the Elmfield Congregational Church; and in Cowes, The Community Church – IoW occupies a former Church of England mission hall.

Sandstone is the Isle of Wight's most important building material.  Upper Greensand formations were found in several parts of the southern half of the island, particularly the Undercliff area near Ventnor, and were extracted for centuries until supplies became exhausted in the 19th century.  Until the 16th century it was used almost exclusively for churches, both on the island and elsewhere in southern England.  Limestone was quarried extensively from the Bembridge Beds off the island's east coast, and from deposits around Ryde, Binstead and Gurnard, from Saxon times until the Victorian era.  A harder, more durable but scarcer variety ("Quarr stone") was used in the island's Saxon churches, and evidence of this survives at Freshwater and Arreton.  More common within these quarries was the less solid "Binstead stone", which occurs in many churches on the island and was still used around Ryde during the town's Victorian expansion.  In contrast to other downland areas of southern England, flint was used rarely because better quality stone was so readily available.

Historic England, the body responsible for listed buildings and other heritage assets in England, also publishes an annual "Heritage at Risk Register"—a survey of assets at risk through decay, damage and similar issues.  The Anglican churches identified as at risk in the latest update were St Mary's Church in Cowes (affected by ingress of water), St James's Church in East Cowes (damp and structural problems), All Saints Church in Godshill (decaying stonework), St Thomas's Minster in Newport (decaying stonework and roofs), St John the Baptist's Church in Niton (decaying stonework, roof damage and ingress of water), St John's Church in Sandown (decaying stonework and ingress of water), the Church of St Saviour-on-the-Cliff in Shanklin (severe salt spalling of stonework and damage to windows), St Paul's Church in Shanklin (decaying stonework and timberwork and damage to windows) and Holy Trinity Church in Ventnor (decaying stonework).  The Catholic Church of St Mary in Ryde is at risk due to water ingress.

Religious affiliation
According to the United Kingdom Census 2011, 138,265 people live on the Isle of Wight.  Of these, 60.52% identified themselves as Christian, 0.38% were Muslim, 0.23% were Hindu, 0.33% were Buddhist, 0.09% were Jewish, 0.03% were Sikh, 0.65% followed another religion, 29.62% claimed no religious affiliation and 8.15% did not state their religion.  The proportions of Christians and people who followed no religion were higher than the figures in England as a whole (59.38% and 24.74% respectively), and the proportion of people who did not answer this census question was also higher than the overall figure of 7.18%.  Islam, Judaism, Hinduism, Sikhism and Buddhism had a much lower following on the island than in the country overall: in 2011, 5.02% of people in England were Muslim, 1.52% were Hindu, 0.79% were Sikh, 0.49% were Jewish and 0.45% were Buddhist.

Administration

Anglican churches

All Church of England churches on the island are part of the Anglican Diocese of Portsmouth and the Archdeaconry of the Isle of Wight.  This archdeaconry, one of three in the diocese, is split into two deaneries: East Wight and West Wight.  The 33 churches in East Wight Deanery are at Arreton, Bembridge (Holy Trinity and St Luke's mission church), Binstead, Bonchurch (old and new churches), Brading, Godshill, Havenstreet, Lake, Newchurch, Niton, Ryde (All Saints, Holy Trinity and St James' in the town centre, St John's in the Oakfield area and St Michael and All Angels at Swanmore), Sandown (Christ Church and St John the Evangelist's), Seaview, Shanklin (St Blasius, St Peter's and St Saviour's), St Helens (St Helen's Church and St Catherine-by-the-Green), St Lawrence (old and new churches), Ventnor (Holy Trinity, St Alban's and St Catherine's), Whitwell, Wroxall and Yaverland.

West Wight Deanery administers 28 churches: at Barton, Brighstone, Brook, Calbourne, Carisbrooke (St Mary the Virgin's and St Nicholas-in-Castro), Chale, Cowes (Holy Trinity, St Faith's and St Mary the Virgin's), East Cowes, Freshwater (All Saints and St Agnes'), Gatcombe, Gurnard, Mottistone, Newport (St John the Baptist's and St Thomas's), Newtown, Northwood, Shalfleet, Shorwell, Thorley, Totland, Whippingham, Wootton (St Mark's and St Edmund's) and Yarmouth.

Roman Catholic Churches
The island's nine Catholic churches are administered by the Isle of Wight Pastoral Area, part of Deanery 5 of the Roman Catholic Diocese of Portsmouth.  The Isle of Wight Pastoral Area has six parishes: Cowes, East Cowes, Newport and Totland Bay each have one church. The parish of Ryde covers churches at Ryde and Bembridge  and South Wight parish includes the churches at Sandown, Shanklin and Ventnor.  Sunday Masses are open to the public are also offered at the chapels of Quarr Abbey near Binstead and St Cecilia's Abbey at Ryde, both of which belong to the Solesmes Congregation of the Order of Saint Benedict.  Both are administratively within Ryde parish.  The Verbum Dei Retreat Centre is behind Carisbrooke Priory, formerly St Dominic's Priory, and is part of Newport parish for administrative purposes.

Other denominations
The Baptist churches at Cowes, Niton, Ryde, Sandown, Ventnor and Wellow, Castlehold Baptist Church in Newport and Colwell Baptist Church at Freshwater are part of the Southern Counties Baptist Association.

The Isle of Wight Methodist Circuit administers the island's Methodist churches.  As of 2016 there were 24 congregations on the island, although not all have their own church: Ventnor's Methodists worship in a church hall  and Yarmouth's congregation shares the Anglican church.  The circuit is one of 14 in the District of Southampton.

Grace Church (Isle of Wight), which has chapels at Ryde and Seaview, belongs to two Evangelical groups: the Fellowship of Independent Evangelical Churches (FIEC), a pastoral and administrative network of about 500 churches with an evangelical outlook, and Affinity (formerly the British Evangelical Council), a network of conservative Evangelical congregations throughout Great Britain.

The Spiritualist churches at Cowes, Ryde and Ventnor belong to the Spiritualists' National Union.  All are within the organisation's Southern District, which also covers Dorset, Hampshire and Wiltshire.

Newport Congregational Church is part of the Congregational Federation, an association of independent Congregational churches in Great Britain.  The federation came into existence in 1972 when the Congregational Church in England and Wales merged with several other denominations to form the United Reformed Church.  Certain congregations wanted to remain independent of this, and instead joined the Congregational Federation.  As of January 2021 there were 235 churches in the Federation.

Listed status

Current places of worship

Notes

References

Bibliography

Isle of Wight
Isle of Wight
 
Places of worship